The team jumping at the 1984 Summer Olympics took place on 7 August at the Santa Anita Racetrack.

Results

References

Equestrian at the 1984 Summer Olympics